Elevate is an edutainment video game developed by Elevate Labs focusing on literacy and numeracy.

Common Sense Media wrote that the game contains "speedy, amusing games sharpen speed but not grammar skills". Cnet conducted a comprehensive comparison of Lumosity and Elevate.

References 

2018 video games
Android (operating system) games
Brain training video games
IOS games
Video games developed in the United States